Ashley Rae Fink (born November 20, 1986) is an American actress and singer. She is known for her roles as Lauren Zizes in the television series Glee and as Carter McMahon in Huge.

Personal life
Ashley Rae Fink was born in Houston, Texas. She has an older sister, Stephanie, and two younger sisters, Amanda and Amy.  She began acting at the age of four after playing the lead role in her school's holiday play. After moving to Los Angeles with her family, Fink began attending an arts high school while studying acting, where she performed in adaptations including The Wizard of Oz (as the Lion), and You're a Good Man Charlie Brown (as Lucy). Fink said she was bullied in high school, but didn't let it get to her.

Career
Fink was largely ignored by the public until she starred in the Tribeca Film Festival hit Fat Girls. She has made multiple TV appearances; she has appeared on Make It or Break It, was the recurring character Lauren Zizes on Fox's Glee, and starred as Carter McMahon on the ABC Family show Huge. She also appeared in the Walt Disney Pictures film You Again starring Betty White, Jamie Lee Curtis, and Sigourney Weaver and in All About Evil appearing beside Mink Stole, Cassandra Peterson, Natasha Lyonne and Thomas Dekker. Fink produced her first short starring Camille Winbush titled "Olivia," which had its premiere at the Frameline film festival in San Francisco.

Fink was cast as Lauren Zizes on the Fox television series Glee, making her initial appearance in the first season episode "Wheels" as a champion high school wrestler and cheerleader tryout candidate." She made irregular appearances until the ninth episode of the second season, "Special Education," when she became the glee club's twelfth member after Kurt Hummel (Chris Colfer) transferred to another school. Fink said that "I was obsessed with Glee before I was a big part of it and I’ve steadily been on it for a while. When I got the script where I joined the glee club I texted Chris Colfer and said, 'I think I just joined the Glee club?' I didn’t quite believe it at first, I thought I was getting 'Punk'd. 

She remained in the glee club for the rest of the season and was given her own storylines. Robert Canning of IGN praised Fink's performance as Lauren and said of the "Silly Love Songs" episode where Puck (Mark Salling) falls in love with her, "I can't decide if I want to root for this couple, but I certainly know I'm going to be rooting for Lauren." Fink received several positive reviews for her performance in "Comeback," in which she sang her first—and only—solo on the show, a cover of "I Know What Boys Like" by The Waitresses. The song was released as a single. 

While Emily VanDerWerff of The A.V. Club found Lauren's relationship with Puck in "Comeback" "a lot less assured" than in the previous episode, "Silly Love Songs," Sandra Gonzalez of Entertainment Weekly deemed their scenes "as endearing as they are unrealistic." CNN Lisa Respers France commented that she was beginning to like Lauren and noted that "for me Lauren represents how Ryan Murphy is able to take the concept of the outcast, flip it on its ear and shove it back in our faces with a side order of fabulousness." Despite the positive critical response, Fink's character quit the glee club in the series season 3 premiere, "The Purple Piano Project." While she appeared in a non-speaking capacity in the Season 3 episode "Asian F" and series creator Murphy alluded to her character's reentry into the plot through interactions with Kurt Hummel, Fink confirmed later that season that she would not be returning to the series. However, she subsequently reprised her role in the season 4 episode "Sadie Hawkins."

Fink also appears in the music video for Stacie Orrico's 2004 hit "I Could Be the One."

Filmography

Discography

Singles

References

External links 

 

1986 births
Actresses from Houston
American television actresses
Living people
American film actresses
21st-century American actresses